Pedro Serra Andreu (23 May 1899 - 9 March 1983) was a Spanish footballer who played as a defender. A historical member of CE Europa in the 1920s, he was one of the first footballers to play for Europa for his entire career, and thus to be part of the so-called one-club men group.

Club career
Born in Reus, Catalonia, he moved to Gràcia district of Barcelona at the age of 9. He began playing football at the lesser teams of CE Europa in 1914, but it only took him three years to reach the first team of the club. He was a member of the great CE Europa side of the 1920s that included figures such as Pelaó, Pellicer, Alcázar and Cros, helping the team win the Catalan Championship in 1923 and to reach the 1923 Copa del Rey Final, where they were beaten 0-1 by Athletic Bilbao. He was kept away from the pitch by a long injury of six months, making his return in March 1929.

International career
Being a CE Europa, he was eligible to play for the Catalan national team, and he was a member of the team that won the last edition of the Prince of Asturias Cup, an inter-regional competition organized by the RFEF, starting in both legs of a two-legged title-decider against Asturias, with both ending in victories to the Catalan side.

Honours

Club
CE Europa
Catalan football championship:
Champions (1): 1922-23

Copa del Rey:
Runner-up (1): 1923

International
Catalonia
Prince of Asturias Cup:
Champions (1): 1926 Prince of Asturias Cup

References

1899 births
1983 deaths
People from Reus
Sportspeople from the Province of Tarragona
Footballers from Catalonia
Spanish footballers
Association football defenders
CE Europa footballers
Catalonia international footballers